Stehekin  is a small unincorporated community in Chelan County, Washington. The name "Stehekin" comes from a word in the Salishan language that means "the way through". Stehekin has about 75 permanent residents, although its population swells during the summer with vacationers and seasonal workers.

Sights and tourism
Stehekin is part of Wenatchee–East Wenatchee Metropolitan Statistical Area. Located at the northwest end of Lake Chelan, it lies just south of the North Cascades National Park. Stehekin is within Lake Chelan National Recreation Area, a unit administered by the National Park Service. 

Sights in Stehekin include the Buckner Homestead Historic District, The Golden West Visitor Center, Stehekin Pastry Company, the one-room Stehekin School, the 312' Rainbow Falls, and Harlequin Bridge. Stehekin is visited by hikers and bikers in the summer, and snowshoers and skiers in the winter, as well as photographers year-round.

Transportation

It is reachable by passenger ferry (the Lady of the Lake), by private boat from Chelan, by foot over Cascade Pass, by floatplane, or by small aircraft via a turf airstrip open from June through September. The vehicles in Stehekin have been barged there on Lake Chelan.

In addition to access by Lake Chelan, visitors come to Stehekin by horseback, hiking, and flying into Stehekin State Airport (Identifier 6S9).  The airport is only open July, August, and September, and is noted by the Washington State Department of Transportation as being one of the state's most challenging airports.  While only  msl, there are mountains on the sides and trees at each end of the  runway.  The airport is often a base for firefighting, at which times it is closed to public use.  The Harlequin campground is located next to the airport. Trout and sockeye salmon are popular targets for fishing in Stehekin.

In 2003, much of the upper (northern) half of the Stehekin Valley Road was washed out by the nearby Stehekin River.

Stehekin is accessible from Washington Pass via the Pacific Crest Trail. The PCT could also be used to access Stehekin from the Suiattle River Valley. Additionally, a network of trails through the mountains east of Stehekin provide access by foot and motorcycle to the Methow Valley area. The Chelan Summit trail starts near the nexus of Grade Creek Road in Chelan and provides a continuous trail all the way into Stehekin. 7,000 feet below on the lake shore runs the Lake Shore Trail, which leads into Stehekin from Prince Creek. The Lady of the Lake ferry services this trail head.

Climate
Stehekin has a dry-summer continental climate (Köppen Dsb) with warm to hot summers and heavy winter snowfall. The precipitation pattern closely resembles a mediterranean climate and using the lower  isotherm for the coldest month, Stehekin may be described as a highly unusual mediterranean climate. Winter temperatures are much colder than those encountered on the windward side of the Cascades, but are still moderate compared to areas further east.

Telephone service

Between March 15 and 28 of 2007, WeavTel, a telecommunications company based in Chelan, at the head of the lake, began normal operations of standard-delivery residential and business telephone service. After having only been served only by highly expensive satellite and radio telephones, Stehekin joined the Washington Telephone Grid after decades of isolation. Although the move was not widely accepted amongst residents, business owners agreed that there is a benefit to having normal telephone service. 

The service is currently limited to the Lower Stehekin Valley, around Stehekin Landing and the village proper, but WeavTel is applying for permits to extend the service into the Upper Valley using underground fiber-optic cables. The move was made possible under federal and state grants that provided support for any telecommunications company willing to extend service to rural areas. Although most other areas of North Central Washington have standard service, most of the areas outside of Wenatchee benefit from the grants as well. One of the first phone calls, a test call, was placed from Stehekin's Silver Bay Resort.

See also
 Holden Village

References

External links
 Lake Chelan Attractions - Frommers Guide

Unincorporated communities in Washington (state)
Unincorporated communities in Chelan County, Washington
Wenatchee–East Wenatchee metropolitan area